Phaea lawi is a species of beetle in the family Cerambycidae. It was described by Chemsak in 1999. It is known from Panama and Costa Rica.

References

lawi
Beetles described in 1999